Diego Cavalieri  (born 1 December 1982) is a Brazilian professional footballer who last played as a goalkeeper for Botafogo. 

Cavalieri is of Italian ancestry and holds both Italian and Brazilian passports. He has earned three caps for the Brazil national team between 2012 and 2013 and was part of the 2013 FIFA Confederations Cup winning team.

Club career

Palmeiras
Born in São Paulo, Cavalieri started his career at Palmeiras, where he made his debut on 24 June 2002 in a 4–0 away win over Rio Claro. Cavalieri played 33 times in the Brazilian Championship.

Liverpool
On 11 July 2008, he signed a four-year contract with Liverpool for an undisclosed fee believed to be in the region of £3 million.

Cavalieri became the third Brazilian player at the club, following the signings of Fábio Aurélio and Lucas. Upon his arrival, he was handed the number 1 shirt, last worn by Jerzy Dudek. Cavalieri made his competitive debut on 23 September 2008 against Crewe Alexandra in the third round of the League Cup. He made his UEFA Champions League debut on 9 December against PSV and his FA Cup debut against Preston North End almost a month later. Cavalieri appeared four times during the 2009–10 season, taking his total of appearances to eight for the club, though he never made an appearance in the Premier League. On 29 July, Cavalieri played the full 90 minutes in Liverpool's first leg of their UEFA Europa League third qualifying round tie against Macedonian side Rabotnički. Liverpool won 2–0 thanks to a David N'Gog header and a Steven Gerrard penalty.

Cesena
On 18 August 2010, then Liverpool boss Roy Hodgson confirmed Cavalieri would join Cesena after the Europa League tie against Trabzonspor. Cavalieri had been unable to dislodge Pepe Reina at Anfield since the Brazilian keeper joined Liverpool from Palmeiras in 2008. The deal was confirmed on 23 August 2010, with Brad Jones taking the vacated number 1 shirt. He left Anfield for an undisclosed fee, having played ten games in two years for Liverpool, none in the Premier League. Cavalieri did not feature in a Serie A game during his six-month stint with Cesena, with head coach Massimo Ficcadenti preferring 41-year-old veteran Francesco Antonioli to him. However, he did play a game in the Coppa Italia, with Cesena losing to Novara by 3 goals to 1.

Fluminense
On 29 December 2010, Cavalieri returned to Brazil, signing with Fluminense. After securing his place in the starting XI during 2011, he was an essential part on Fluminense's title campaign in 2012 First Division, and his displays earned him his debut on national team and the Best Goalkeeper award in that year.

Crystal Palace
On 2 March 2018, Cavalieri was signed by Premier League club Crystal Palace on a short-term contract. He was released by the club in June on expiry of his contract.

International career
On 13 November 2012, Cavalieri was called up by Mano Menezes for the Brazil squad that will play Superclásico de las Américas. Playing 90 minutes, Cavalieri, in his debut, won the title.

Club

Honours
Palmeiras
Campeonato Brasileiro Série B: 2003
Campeonato Paulista: 2008

Fluminense
Campeonato Carioca: 2012
Campeonato Brasileiro Série A: 2012

Brazil
FIFA U-17 World Cup: 1999
Superclásico de las Américas: 2012
FIFA Confederations Cup: 2013

Individual
Campeonato Brasileiro Série A Team of the Year: 2012

References

External links

LFCHistory.net Profile

1982 births
Brazilian footballers
Brazil international footballers
Brazilian expatriate footballers
Brazilian people of Italian descent
Association football goalkeepers
2013 FIFA Confederations Cup players
Sociedade Esportiva Palmeiras players
Liverpool F.C. players
A.C. Cesena players
Fluminense FC players
Crystal Palace F.C. players
Living people
Footballers from São Paulo
Expatriate footballers in England
Expatriate footballers in Italy
Campeonato Brasileiro Série A players
Campeonato Brasileiro Série B players
FIFA Confederations Cup-winning players